German submarine U-537 was a Type IXC/40 U-boat of Nazi Germany's Kriegsmarine during World War II. Her keel was laid down on 10 April 1942 by Deutsche Werft in Hamburg. She was commissioned on 27 January 1943 with Kapitänleutnant Peter Schrewe in command. Schrewe commanded the boat for nearly two years, until her loss.

U-537 conducted three patrols and holds the distinction of making the only armed German landing in North America during World War II, when her crew installed the automatic Weather Station Kurt in Martin Bay, Labrador on 22 October 1943. She was then sent to the Far East.

Design
German Type IXC/40 submarines were slightly larger than the original Type IXCs. U-537 had a displacement of  when at the surface and  while submerged. She had two shafts and two  propellers.

U-537 was fitted with six  torpedo tubes (four fitted at the bow and two at the stern), 22 torpedoes, one  SK C/32 naval gun, 180 rounds, and a  SK C/30 as well as a  C/30 anti-aircraft gun. The boat had a complement of forty-eight.

Service history

First patrol
U-537 left Kiel on 18 September 1943 and sailed to Bergen, Norway, departing from there on her first patrol on 30 September. She sailed across the North Atlantic, and on 22 October she set up Wetter-Funkgerät Land-26 (code-named "Kurt") automatic weather station in Martin Bay, Labrador. The weather station was only discovered by accident by Canadian authorities in 1981.

While on anti-shipping patrol off Newfoundland on 31 October, the U-boat was attacked by a Canadian Hudson aircraft from No. 11 Squadron RCAF, which fired eight rockets, all missing. On 10 November a Canadian Catalina aircraft from No. 5 Squadron RCAF attacked her with four depth charges off Cape Race. The U-boat escaped unharmed, but the next day another Catalina of 5 Squadron attacked with four depth charges which slightly damaged the submarine. Surface ships then joined the hunt, but all failed to locate her, and U-537 arrived safely at Lorient on 8 December.

Second patrol
U-537 sailed from Lorient on 25 March 1944 and traveled around Africa, and then crossed the Indian Ocean to Batavia, which she reached on 2 August after a voyage of 131 days.

Third patrol
U-537 left Batavia for Surabaya in Indonesia on 1 October 1944, and began her third and final patrol on 9 November. U-537 was one of 10 German U-boats lost in Asian or East African waters during the war.

References

Bibliography

External links

German Type IX submarines
U-boats commissioned in 1943
U-boats sunk in 1944
World War II submarines of Germany
Indian Ocean U-Boats
World War II shipwrecks in the Java Sea
1942 ships
U-boats sunk by US submarines
Ships built in Hamburg
Ships lost with all hands
Maritime incidents in November 1944